The Electric Barbarellas were an American all-female electropop group whose career with producer Midi Mafia was depicted in a short-lived, critically panned, eponymous reality show that ran for one season on MTV.

Background
In 2010, Viacom CEO Sumner Redstone personally paid over $500,000 to fly the group to New York to meet with record labels while filming a reality-TV series based on the trip, after asking then-Viacom CEO Philippe Dauman to give one of his romantic pursuits an MTV series. Redstone then forced Viacom-owned MTV to air the series. MTV executives originally balked at airing it because it was "so bad" but their resistance almost cost MTV's then-CEO Judy McGrath her job.Les Moonves also arranged for the series to be promoted on CBS, as a favor to Redstone.

The series ended with a phone call from a record executive provoking much shrieking, but the group quickly faded into obscurity once the show ended.

The group performed the song "Without You" on The Late Late Show with Craig Ferguson on May 27, 2011.

Members 
 Heather Naylor, Chelsea Costa, Gynger Fluellen, Missy, and Raven

Discography 
 Strange World (2011)

The Alectrix
Two years later, Naylor hired Joe Simpson (father of Ashlee and Jessica Simpson) to audition new members for the group, under the new name The Alectrix. Again, the ordeal was filmed as a reality-TV series and aired on MTV. And again, soon after the series ended, the group faded quickly into obscurity.

Later, Naylor was sued by Sumner Redstone's girlfriend Sydney Holland for allegedly stealing her laptop. Naylor counter-sued, claiming Holland negatively influenced Redstone to intentionally interfere with the success of The Alectrix, however Naylor eventually dropped the lawsuit.

References

External links 
 
 
 
 
 

American pop girl groups
American pop music groups
MTV original programming
21st-century musicians
Reality television